Sing Along with Mitch was a music television show that ran from 1961 to 1964.

Format

At the start and end of each episode, lyrics to songs were shown at the bottom of the television screen, hence the Sing Along title. Contrary to popular belief, there was no bouncing ball going over the words, which was part of the theatrically-released Screen Songs and Song Cartunes cartoons.

Three of the singers were given comedy segments in the series, as of September 1961. Ken Schoen, Hubert Hendrie, and Stan Carlson were known as The Vocalamities.

Mystery guests
In later seasons, the male chorus was supplemented by unannounced mystery guests, only admitted to at the end of the year. Celebrities were paid $500 for participating. Only former United States President Harry Truman turned down the offer in the first season. Frank Lovejoy appeared in one finale, but died before the episode aired. A new finale was recorded and aired.

 Ray Bolger
 Red Buttons

Production

The series was inspired by the popular Sing Along with Mitch album series. During one week in 1958, the top three albums Sing Along with Mitch, More Sing Along with Mitch, and Christmas Sing Along with Mitch. A May 1961 test broadcast received more than 20,000 positive letters and telegrams, billed as "one of the largest totals in TV history."

Miller cast his choir for their voices, explaining "if a guy's bald or if he's fat, that's the way he'll appear on the show. I think that the audience likes it that way." He noted that the singers took a longer time to rehearse than trained dancers, but that viewers could identify with them better than "Adonises."

Broadcast history
The program was initially seen every second Friday at 9 pm, alternating with the Bell Telephone Hour. By September 1961, it moved to Thursdays at 10 pm, airing weekly.

By January 1964, Broadcasting magazine was predicting that the series would be cancelled due to low ratings, and the change of the music scene (the forthcoming British Invasion).

Legacy
In October 1961, a Sing Along with Mitch book was published.

References

Sing-along television shows
1960s American music television series